The Khassonké  (CAH-KES-SON-QUE) are an ethnic group of Mali's Kayes Region. Descendants of the Fula and Malinké Khasso kingdoms, they speak the Khassonke/Xaasongaxango language, a Manding language similar to Bambara.

Their traditional musical instruments are the dundunba (a big cylindrical drum with two skins), the jingò (a small cylindrical drum with two skins), the tantanwò (a small drum), the tamandinwo (an aisselle drum), as well as lutes and harps and hunters' whistles.

External links

 Khassonké resource site  
 ethnologue.com:Khassonké
 khassonke music, song, and dance

Ethnic groups in Mali
Kayes